Green Mamba is a soccer team based in Manzini- Matsapha, Eswatini. They have appeared in the CAF Champions league twice, 2001 against Zanaco and Ferraviaro and in 2012 in Zimbabwe against FC Platinum.

Achievements
Trade Fair Cup-2001/2003/2004
Swazi Bank Cup  2004/2012
Premier League of Eswatini: 2
2011, 2019
Ingwenyama Cup  2019 Edition.

Swazi Bank Cup: 2
2004, 2012.

Swazi Charity Cup: 0

Performance in CAF competitions
CAF Champions League: 2 appearances
2012 –
2020 – Preliminary Round

CAF Confederation Cup: 0 appearance

Football clubs in Eswatini
1987 establishments in Swaziland
Association football clubs established in 1987